Arctornis is a genus of tussock moths in the family Erebidae, and the sole member of the tribe Arctornithini. The genus was erected by Ernst Friedrich Germar in 1810.

Species
The following species are included in the genus:

References

Lymantriinae
Moth genera